Ray Charles Witter (February 19, 1896 – August 4, 1983) was an American football end who played four seasons with the Rochester Jeffersons of the National Football League. He first enrolled at Syracuse University before transferring to Alfred University. He attended Warsaw High School in Warsaw, New York.

References

External links
Just Sports Stats

1896 births
1983 deaths
Players of American football from New York (state)
American football ends
Syracuse Orange football players
Alfred Saxons football players
Rochester Jeffersons players
People from Perry, New York